Eunos MRT station is an above-ground Mass Rapid Transit (MRT) station on the East West MRT Line in Geylang, Singapore. It is located next to the Eunos Bus Interchange.

The station was named in honour of an early Malay pioneer, Muhammad Eunos bin Abdullah, who secured 700-hectares of land for Malay settlements in the area called Jalan Eunos Malay Settlement (Kampung Melayu).

Design
The station has a different style of architecture from other stations on the eastern part of the East West Line, having been designed with a traditional Malay roof structure (Atap Minangkabau) and with a shape similar to the stations in the western part of the East-West Line (Chinese Garden to Boon Lay stations), and the northern part of the North South Line (Bukit Batok to Khatib stations) except for Woodlands, using modern materials such as steel beams, similar to that of the Eunos Bus Interchange. This is to provide a sense of identity to the area, as Eunos Bus Interchange lies close to Geylang Serai and the Malay Village.

History

Contract 303 was awarded to Okumura/Oh Teck Thye for the construction of a viaduct from Paya Lebar station to Kembangan station, including Eunos station and Kembangan station on 17 December 1985. Construction began in January 1986 and was completed on 4 November 1989.

As with most of the above-ground stations along the East West Line, it was built without platform screen doors. The installation of half-height platform screen doors started on 5 October 2010 and operations started on 16 December that year. This station is installed with high-volume low-speed fans, which started operations on 11 September 2012 together with Queenstown MRT station.

Installation of a privacy screen from Eunos Road 5 to Eunos Road 2 began in January 2017 and was completed in July 2017.

References

External links

 

Railway stations in Singapore opened in 1989
Geylang
Mass Rapid Transit (Singapore) stations